Sanath Mohan Silva Kaluperuma (born 22 October 1961) is a former Sri Lankan cricketer who played in four Tests and two ODIs from 1984 to 1988.

Life and career
Born in Colombo, Kaluperuma studied at Nalanda College Colombo and represented Bloomfield Cricket and Athletic Club. A top-order batsman who could open and a handy off-spin bowler, he was also a skilled slip (gully) fielder.

Kaluperuma migrated to Melbourne, Australia, in 1989 where he played district cricket and later captain-coached the Mount Waverley, Cheltenham and Keysborough clubs.

His elder brother, Lalith Kaluperuma, represented Sri Lanka in their inaugural Test matches.

References

External links
 

1961 births
Living people
Sri Lanka Test cricketers
Sri Lanka One Day International cricketers
Sri Lankan cricketers
Bloomfield Cricket and Athletic Club cricketers
Alumni of Nalanda College, Colombo
Cricketers from Colombo